Tuckahoe is a census-designated place unincorporated community located within Upper Township in Cape May County of New Jersey.

History
The tuckahoe was pounded into pulp by local Native Americans and used for cooking and baking, as flour, which served as an ingredient in their cornbread.

Since the tuckahoe was found in great abundance in this area, members of various Lenape tribes would visit this location to collect them.

A bridge, constructed in 1926 and renovated in 1961, connects Tuckahoe to Corbin City, its neighbor to the north. It is also the headquarters for the Cape May Seashore Lines Railroad.

Tuckahoe is named after the wild tuckahoe, which is the sclerotium of the fungus Wolfiporia extensa and sometimes also called Indian Bread, which grew in abundance in this area on the roots of certain trees and was collected by the members of the Lenape tribes in the area.

Roads
Tuckahoe Road, which has its beginnings in Cross Keys, New Jersey at Route 42, is an alternative way to get to Ocean City at the northern edge of Cape May County and other shore points as alterative route to the Atlantic City Expressway.

Education
As with other parts of Upper Township, the area is zoned to Upper Township School District (for grades K-8),  which sends students to Ocean City High School for grades 9-12.

Countywide schools include Cape May County Technical High School and Cape May County Special Services School District.

See also 
 Tuckahoe station (New Jersey)
 Lenape
 Kechemeche

References

External links

"Tuckahoe history" at TuckahoeNJ.com website

Census-designated places in Cape May County, New Jersey
Unincorporated communities in Cape May County, New Jersey
Unincorporated communities in New Jersey
Upper Township, New Jersey